Saint-Justin is a municipality in the Mauricie region of the province of Quebec in Canada.

On December 6, 2014, Saint-Justin changed from parish municipality to a (regular) municipality.

References 

Municipalities in Quebec
Incorporated places in Mauricie